Rondeletia is a genus name. It can refer to:

 Rondeletia, the redmouth whalefishes
 Rondeletia (plant), flowering plants in the madder family (Rubiaceae)